Waheed Yar Khan (born 9 November 1942, Hyderabad, Andhra Pradesh, India) is a former cricketer who played first-class cricket in India from 1960 to 1968, and in Pakistan from 1969 to 1975.

Career in India
A batsman, Waheed Yar Khan represented South Zone Schools in the Cooch Behar Trophy from 1957-58 to 1959-60, captaining the team to victory in 1959-60. He then represented Osmania University in the Rohinton Baria Trophy from 1960-61 to 1964-65.

He made his first-class debut for Hyderabad in the Ranji Trophy in 1960-61, and played occasionally over the next three seasons. When Hyderabad reached the finals in 1964-65 he made 67 not out in the quarter-final, 109 (his first century) in the semi-final, and was Hyderabad's top-scorer in the final with 78 and 23 when they lost to Bombay. He played one match for South Zone, when they were skittled for 62 by a West Indian attack led by Charlie Griffith in 1966-67. He did not score another century until he made 174 not out for Hyderabad against Andhra in 1968-69, when he added 258 for the fourth wicket with Kenia Jayantilal.

Career in Pakistan
In 1969 he followed his parents, who had moved to Pakistan. He was immediately selected to play for Karachi Whites and Pakistan International Airlines.

He had his best season in Pakistan in 1970-71 when he scored 342 runs in five matches at an average of 68.40, including 116 not out for Pakistan International Airlines B against National Bank. His last century came in 1972-73 when he made 119 for PIA against Lahore B.

He lives in retirement in Margate, Florida, with his wife, Rehana.

References

External links
 Waheed Yar Khan at CricketArchive

1942 births
Living people
Indian cricketers
Pakistani cricketers
Indian emigrants to Pakistan
Osmania University alumni
Hyderabad cricketers
State Bank of India cricketers
Karachi cricketers
Muhajir people
People from Karachi
Pakistan International Airlines cricketers
Cricketers from Hyderabad, India
Pakistani people of Hyderabadi descent
People from Margate, Florida